The 10th Infantry Regiment was an infantry regiment that served in the Lithuanian Army from its founding in 1919 to 1924. The regiment fought against Poles in the Lithuanian Wars of Independence near Augustavas, Suvalkai, Seinai and elsewhere.

1919 
On 10 June 1919, the 1st Infantry Regiment's 3rd Battalion was separated from the regiment and was renamed as the 1st Reserve Battalion. The battalion was supposed to train new recruits, but when the Poles invaded Lithuania, the battalion, under the command of Officer Žukas, had to take part in actions in the Suvalkai Region. The Command companies of Seinai, Vilkaviškis, Alytus and Suvalkai also operated attached to the Reserve Battalion. On August 1919, Suvalkai Commandant Company is assigned to the Reserve Battalion.

1920 
On 1 July 1920, the battalion's line lengthened from the border with Germany even until Druskininkai.

August 
On 1 August 1920, the Reserve Battalion was reformed and renamed as the two-battalion 10th Infantry Regiment. The regiment's commander was Major . On 24 August 1920, the regiment held the line Grabavas—Ožė, and on August 26, from Grabavas—Augustavas—Štabinas—Lipskas. The commander of the 1st Company was given the separate task of concentrating in Ožė, and, if the opportunity arises, to take over Gardinas. On 30 August, when the Poles attacked, the regiment's forces, as they were widely dispersed, had to retreat. On 31 August, the Poles occupied Suvalkai and the Seinai.

September 
The regiment's front was from Vižainis to Žagariai, and many clashes took place until mid-September. On September 11, the regiment was ordered to concentrate in Kalvarija and be the reserve of the Marijampolė Group. On September 22, the regiment went to the front near . On September 23, the regiment went to Seirijai and together with the remains of the 8th Infantry Regiment, they took the position —— river until Nemunas near . On September 28, the regiment is moved to the —Salopieragiai district.

October 
The regiment received its official name in October. On October 9, the regiment concentrated in Marijampolė. On October 16, it reached the Vievis district, where the regiment remained until the end of the operations as the divisional reserve. On December 4, it went to Marijampolė.

Interwar 
In 1921, the regiment's feast was established on March 30. The regiment was reorganized as the 2nd Separate Border Battalion in 1923. It was disbanded on 1 March 1924.

Commanders 

 Officer Konstantinas Žukas
 Major

References

Sources 

 
 
 

Military units and formations established in 1919
Military units and formations disestablished in 1924
Infantry regiments of Lithuania